Antonio Pucci (born 8 October 1485 in Firenze – 12 October 1544 in Bagnoregio) was a Cardinal of the Catholic Church.

Antonio Pucci emanated from the Florentine noble family of Pucci. He was a nephew of Cardinals Roberto Pucci and Lorenzo Pucci.

On March 7, 1510, the feast of St. Thomas, Pucci delivered the annual encomium in honor of the "angelic doctor" for the Santa Maria sopra Minerva studium generale, the future Pontifical University of St. Thomas Aquinas, Angelicum.

After Antonio Pucci participated in the Fifth Council of the Lateran (1512–1517), he served as Nuncio in Switzerland from 1517 to 1521. From 1518 he was bishop of Pistoia. From 1529 to 1541 Pucci was bishop of Vannes. Since 1 October 1529 he was Penitentiary major. Pucci was appointed Cardinal by Pope Clement VII on 22 September 1531. His titular church was Santi Quattro Coronati. He participated in the papal conclave of 1534 that elected Pope Paul III. Pucci later became bishop of the suburbicarian dioceses of Albano (1542/43) and of Sabina (1543/44).

Episcopal succession

References

External links 
 
  Pucci, Antonio. Historic Lexicon of Switzerland.

1485 births
1544 deaths
16th-century Italian Roman Catholic bishops
16th-century Italian cardinals
Clergy from Florence
Major Penitentiaries of the Apostolic Penitentiary
Antonio
Diplomats of the Holy See
Apostolic Nuncios to Switzerland